The boys' 200 metre freestyle event at the 2010 Youth Olympic Games took place on August 16, at the Singapore Sports School.

Medalists

Heats

Heat 1

Heat 2

Heat 3

Heat 4

Heat 5

Heat 6

Final

References
Heats Summary
Final

Swimming at the 2010 Summer Youth Olympics